The 1958–59 season was the 21st season of competitive association football in the Football League played by Chester, an English club based in Chester, Cheshire.

Chester competed in the newly formed Fourth Division. Alongside competing in the Football League the club also participated in the FA Cup and the Welsh Cup.

Football League

Results summary

Results by matchday

Matches

FA Cup

Welsh Cup

Season statistics

References

1958-59
English football clubs 1958–59 season